Shepherd House may refer to:

Rayward–Shepherd House, New Canaan, Connecticut
J. R. Shepherd House, Paris, Idaho
Earl Shepherd Bungalow, Paris, Idaho, listed on the National Register of Historic Places (NRHP)
Shepherd Bungalow, Paris, Idaho, listed on the NRHP
Les and Hazel Shepherd Bungalow, Paris, Idaho, listed on the NRHP
Ted Shepherd Cottage, Paris, Idaho
Strawbridge-Shepherd House, Springfield, Illinois
Shepherd's Delight, Still Pond, Maryland, NRHP-listed, a historic house
Shepherd House, part of the Parsons, Shepherd, and Damon Houses Historic District, Northampton, Massachusetts
William Shepherd House, Bath, New York
Perry-Shepherd Farm, Lansing, North Carolina
Champion-Shepherdson House, Princeton, Kentucky, NRHP-listed in Caldwell County
Dr. Warren Shepherd House, Beaver, Utah, listed on the NRHP
Harriet S. Shepherd House, Beaver, Utah, listed on the NRHP
Van Swearingen-Shepherd House, Shepherdstown, West Virginia
Shepherd Hall, Wheeling, West Virginia

See also
Shepherd Building (disambiguation)